Laura Secord s.e.c is a Canadian chocolatier, confectionery, and ice cream company. It is owned by Jean Leclerc of Quebec City, who owns Nutriart, a company devoted to chocolate production. Nutriart is a former division of Biscuits Leclerc.

History

Founding
The company was founded in 1913 by Frank P. O'Connor with its first store on Yonge Street in Toronto, Ontario. 

He chose the name to honor the Canadian heroine Laura Secord. In 1813, Secord, pioneer wife and mother of seven children, made a dangerous 19-mile (30-km) journey on foot to warn Lieutenant James FitzGibbon of a planned American attack. Her bravery contributed to victory at the Battle of Beaver Dams.

In 1919 O'Connor founded the  Fanny Farmer Candy Stores in the US, appropriating the name and highly esteemed reputation of American culinary expert Fannie Farmer, who had absolutely no relationship to his company.

Ownership changes
In 1969, Laura Secord was sold by the O'Connor family to John Labatt Limited. In 1983 it was acquired by British-owned Rowntree Mackintosh Confectionery of York, England. Its successor, Nestlé's Canadian unit, sold it in 1998 to Archibald Candy Corporation of Chicago, which then sold it to Gordon Brothers LLC of Boston in 2004. In 2004, there were 174 outlets throughout the country and a staff of 1,600.

In 2010 Jean and Jacques Leclerc of Quebec purchased the company.

Today
, the LeClercs still own the business, which has been reduced to 100 retail outlets offering some 400 products. It has offices in Mississauga, Ontario, and Quebec City, Quebec, and offers online purchase and shipping to Canada and the U.S..

References

External links
 

Rowntree's brands
Canadian chocolate companies
Retail companies established in 1913
Companies based in Mississauga
Ice cream brands
Ice cream parlors
1913 establishments in Ontario
Food and drink companies established in 1913
Confectionery stores
Canadian companies established in 1913